Lehmon Pallo-77 (abbreviated LehPa) is a football club from Lehmo, Kontiolahti in Eastern Finland. The club was formed in 1977 and at one time was also active in volleyball and ice-hockey.  The men's football first team currently plays in the Kolmonen (Third Division).  Their home ground is at the Lehmon urheilukeskus.

Background

LehPa-77 has spent many seasons in the lower divisions of the Finnish football league.  They have played one season in the Kakkonen (Second Division), the third tier of Finnish football, in 2004. In the 1990s the club ran a Ladies Team which progressed as high as the Women's First Division.

The club from the outset has had an important role offering physical activity to Lehmo and the municipality of Kontiolahti and its villages.  The club now has more than 200 registered players and makes full use of indoor and outdoor facilities in the Lehmo area.

Season to season

Club Structure

Lehmon Pallo −77 run a number of teams including 2 men's team, 7 boys teams and 1 girls team.

2010 season

LehPa-77 First Team are competing in the Kolmonen administered by the Itä-Suomi SPL and Keski-Suomi SPL.  This is the fourth highest tier in the Finnish football system.  In 2009 LehPa were promoted from Section A of the Nelonen administered by the Itä-Suomi SPL.

LehPa-77/2 are competing in the Vitonen administered by the Itä-Suomi SPL.

References and sources
Official Club Website
Finnish Wikipedia

Footnotes

Football clubs in Finland
Kontiolahti
1977 establishments in Finland